Kim Sung-cheol (born December 31, 1991) is a South Korean actor. He achieved initial success in stage musicals before being cast in his debut television role as Kim Young-cheol (a.k.a. 'Jailbird') in Prison Playbook (2017). He is recognised for his roles in The Battle of Jangsari (2019), Do You Like Brahms? (2020) and Our Beloved Summer (2021), among other works.

Career 
Kim made his debut in the musical Puberty in 2014. In the following years, he appeared in various musicals including My Bucket List, Werther and Fan Letter. For his performance as Tobias Ragg in the 2016 Korean production of Sweeney Todd, he received the award for Best Rookie Actor at the Korea Musical Awards. 
He was double-cast with Hong Kwang-ho as the central role of Seo In-hu in the 2017 revival of Mr. Mouse, a Korean musical based on the short story Flowers for Algernon.

In 2017, Kim made his television debut in Prison Playbook.

In 2018, Kim starred in the musical rom-com To. Jenny opposite Jung Chae-yeon. Kim also joined in the film Too Hot to Die. In October 2018, Kim joined the drama OCN Player.

In 2019, Kim acted in the JTBC drama The Wind Blows as well as the tvN series Arthdal Chronicles. He also starred in the war film The Battle of Jangsari, for which he won a Best New Actor award in the 27th Korean Culture and Entertainment Awards. The same year, Kim played a supporting role in the film Kim Ji-young: Born 1982.

In 2020, Kim appeared in the SBS drama Do You Like Brahms?, earning him a nomination for Best New Actor at the 2020 SBS Drama Awards. The same year, Kim appeared as Jung Ui-myeong in the Netflix apocalyptic horror series Sweet Home.

In 2021, Kim made special appearances in Vincenzo and Racket Boys. In addition, Kim was cast as an MC in Channel A's DIMF Musical Star. Later in July, Kim was confirmed to star in the SBS drama Our Beloved Summer which premiered in December 2021. In August 2021, Kim was confirmed to join the historical film The Owl, where the filming began in September 2021.

Kim is slated to make his return to musicals as L in the upcoming 2022 Korean production of Death Note.

Filmography

Film

Television series

Web series

Television shows

Theater

Musicals 
{| class="wikitable sortable plainrowheaders"
|-
! scope="col" | Year
! scope="col" | English title
! scope="col" | Korean title
! scope="col" | Role
! scope="col" class="unsortable" | 
|-
! scope="row" | 2014 
| Puberty
| 사춘기
| Yong-man
| <ref name=2016interview>{{cite news |author=An Se-young |title=인터뷰: "안녕! 유에프오" 김성철 |trans-title= Interview: Au Revoir! UFO'''s Kim Sung-cheol|url=https://www.themusical.co.kr/Magazine/Detail?num=2667 |access-date=February 7, 2022 |work=The Musical |date=February 3, 2016 |language=ko}}</ref>
|-
! scope="row"  rowspan=3 | 2015
| My Bucket List [ko]
| 마이 버킷 리스트
| Hae-gi
| 
|-
| Sontag Hotel  
| 손탁호텔 
| Jun
|
|-
| Pungwolju [ko]
| 풍월주
| Sa-dam
| 
|-
! scope="row"  | 2015–2016
| Werther| 베르테르 
| Kainz
| 
|-
! scope="row" rowspan=3 | 2016 
| Au Revoir! UFO 
| 안녕! 유에프오 
| Sang-gu
| 
|-
| Sweeney Todd| 스위니 토드
| Tobias Ragg
| 
|-
| Fan Letter| 팬레터
| Jung Se-hun
| 
|-
! scope="row"  | 2017 
| Mr. Mouse| 미스터 마우 
| Seo In-hu 
| 
|-
! scope="row"| 2018 
| Vampire Arthur| 뱀파이어 아더 
| Arthur
|
|-
! scope="row"  | 2019–2020
| Big Fish| 빅피쉬
| Will Bloom
| 
|-
! scope="row"  | 2022
| rowspan=2| Death Note|  rowspan=2|데스노트
|  rowspan=2|L
|  
|-
! scope="row"| 2023
|
|}

 Plays 

 Discography
 Soundtrack appearances 

 Cast recordings 
 Musical Pyungweolju (Original Soundtrack) (2015)
 My Bucket List (Original Cast Recording) (2016)
 Musical Mr. Mouse OST'' (2017)

Awards and nominations

References

External links
 
 

1991 births
Living people
South Korean male film actors
South Korean male television actors
21st-century South Korean male actors
Korea National University of Arts alumni